The Roman Catholic Archdiocese of Madras and Mylapore/Madras and Myliapor is an archdiocese based in the city of Madras (now Chennai), in India. It took also the name of the ancient diocese of Mylapore, now a part of Chennai.

History
 9 January 1606: erection of the diocese of Mylapore by pope Paul V by agreement with the king of Portugal who received power to appoint bishops and priests and, in a generall way, to look after the evangelization of the area (Padroado system and jurisdiction)
 1642: Madras Capuchin Mission founded by French Capuchin Missionary Fr. Ephrem de Nevers was Established as Prefecture Vicariate of Fort Saint George This was an independent jurisdiction of the Propaganda Fide from the Padroado Diocese of São Tomé of Meliapore
 1832: Renamed as Apostolic Vicariate of Madras
 1 September 1886: Promoted as Metropolitan Archdiocese of Madras
 10 October 1950: The Padroado system is cancelled. The Diocese of Mylapore comes under the jurisdiction of the 'Propaganda Fide'.
 13 November 1952: Mylapore and Madras are merged into the renamed 'Metropolitan Archdiocese of Madras and Mylapore' (Bull Ex primaevae ecclesiae of Pius XII).

Leadership

 Archbishops of Madras and Mylapore (Latin Rite)
 Archbishop George Antonysamy (21 November 2012 – present); formerly, Apostolic Nuncio (Liberia, Gambia, & Sierra Leone)
 Archbishop Malayappan Chinnappa, S.D.B. (1 April 2005 – 21 November 2012)
 Archbishop James Masilamony Arul Das (11 May 1994 – 30 August 2004)
 Archbishop Casimir Gnanadickam, S.J. (26 January 1987 – 10 November 1993)
 Archbishop Anthony Rayappa Arulappa (1 February 1966 – 26 January 1987)
 Archbishop Louis Mathias, S.D.B. (13 November 1952 – 2 August 1965)
 Metropolitan Archbishops of Madras (Latin Rite)
 Archbishop Louis Mathias, S.D.B. (25 March 1935 – 13 November 1952)
 Archbishop Eugène Mederlet, S.D.B. (3 July 1928 – 12 December 1934)
 Archbishop Giovanni Aelen, M.H.M. (13 February 1911 – 1928)
 Archbishop Joseph Colgan (19 May 1882 – 13 February 1911)
 Vicars Apostolic of Madras (Roman Rite)
 Bishop Stephen Fennelly (1868-1880)
 Bishop John Fennelly (1841-1868)
 Bishop Patrick Joseph Carew (1840-1841)
 Bishop Daniel O'Connor, O.S.A. (1834-1840)

Suffragan dioceses
 Chingleput
 Coimbatore
 Ootacamund
 Vellore

Patron Saints
 Saint Thomas the Apostle
 Saint Joseph

Saints and causes for canonisation
 The tomb of St. Thomas the Apostle is in Chennai.
 Servant of God, Mother Thatipatri Gnanamma

Churches 

 St. Joseph Church, Madras 
 All Saints Church (2004),  Madras 
 Amalaurtpava Church (2004), Madras)
 Annai Velankani Church, (2001), Madras 
 Annunication Church (1982), Madras
 Blessed Sacrament Church (2011), Madras
 Christ the Emmanuel Church (1971), Madras
 Christ the King Church (1994), Madras
 Divine Mercy Church (2008), Madras
 Don Bosch Shrine (1964), Madras
 Fathima Misson (2007), Madras
 Good Sheperd Church (2008), Madras
 Holy Cross Church (1978), Madras.
 Holy Eucharist Church (2005), Madras
 Holy Family Church (2007) Madras
 Holy Spirit Church (2006) Madras
 Holy Trinity Church (1994), Madras
 Infant Jesus Church (1980), Madras

Religious congregations, societies and institutes

Religious institutes of men 

 Oblates of Mary Immaculate
 Brothers of St.Patrick's 
 Carmelites  of Mary Immaculate
 Congregation of the Blessed Sacrament 
 Congregation of the Missions
 Congregation of the Holy Redeemer 
 Herald of Good News
 Holy Cross Brothers of Sacred Heart
 Hospitaller Brothers of St.John of God
Missionaries of Mary Immaculate 
Missionaries of St.Francis De Sales 
Missionary Brothers of Charity 
Monfort Brothers of St.Gabriel
Order of Friars Minor (Franciscans)
Order of Friars Minor (Capuchins)
Salesians of Don Bosco
Servants of Charity
Society of Jesus
Society of St.Paul
Sons of Immaculate Heart of Mary

References

External links

 Archdioceseofmadreasmylapore.in
 GCatholic.org
 Catholic Hierarchy

Roman Catholic dioceses in India
Religious organizations established in the 1640s
1642 establishments in Asia
Roman Catholic dioceses and prelatures established in the 17th century
Organisations based in Chennai
Christianity in Tamil Nadu